Starksia ocellata, the checkered blenny, is a species of labrisomid blenny native to the Atlantic Ocean and the Caribbean Sea from North Carolina, United States, to Brazil. It can reach a length of  TL. It can also be found in the aquarium trade.

References

ocellata
Fish described in 1876